Dogo is a small town and commune in the Cercle of Bougouni in the Sikasso Region of southern Mali. As of 2009 the commune had a population of 33,466.

References

Communes of Sikasso Region